Smith's the Name is a studio album by country music singer Carl Smith. It was released in 1957 by Columbia Records (catalog CL-1022).

In Billboard magazine's annual poll of country and western disc jockeys, it was ranked No. 6 among the "Favorite Country Music LPs" of 1957.

AllMusic gave the album a rating of four stars.

Track listing
Side A
 "San Antonio Rose"
 "Time Changes Everything"
 "Lovin' Is Livin'"
 "Oh No!"
 "If I Could Hold Back the Dawn"
 "That's What You Think"

Side B
 "Live and Let Live"
 "If You Want It, I Got It"
 "Please Come Back Home"
 "Look What Thoughts Done to Me"
 "The House that Love Built"
 "Come Back to Me"

References

1957 albums
Carl Smith (musician) albums
Columbia Records albums